Free and Solidary (Polish: Wolni i Solidarni, WiS) was a small political party in Poland. Founder Kornel Morawiecki, the Senior Marshal of the Sejm, led the party until his death in 2019. The party was plagued with poor electoral performances, lack of agreements with other parties, and later legal troubles which led to a court-appointed curator disbanding the party in 2020.

History
MPs of the party were initially elected from the lists of Kukiz'15, until an acrimonious split as WiS decided to align themselves with the United Right.

The party formally declared support for the economic and social policy of the Law and Justice (PiS) governments led by Prime Minister Beata Szydło and later her successor Mateusz Morawiecki. In December 2018, then-WiS Sejm Deputy Ireneusz Zyska crossed the floor to join the Law and Justice parliamentary club, followed by Adam Andruszkiewicz when he became Deputy Minister of Digital Affairs in Cabinet of Mateusz Morawiecki. On April 3, 2019, Sylwester Chruszcz also left WiS to join PiS.

During the 2019 Polish parliamentary election, it was announced that all three incumbent WiS deputies are seeking election on the PiS lists, with then-WiS leader Kornel Morawiecki standing as a candidate for the Senate in Constituency № 59 (Białystok), while Jarosław Porwich (#15 on the PiS list in Constituency № 8 (Zielona Góra)) and Małgorzata Zwiercan (#5 on the PiS list in Constituency № 26 (Słupsk)) were seeking re-election to the Sejm; however, all three remained as members of the WiS parliamentary club and did not join the PiS group in the Sejm, due to the breakdown of negotiations between the two parties. Allegedly, the party's pro-Russian stance was a major source of contention.

With the passing of Morawiecki, he was replaced as the candidate for the Senate in Constituency № 59 by a member of Law and Justice, and the party no longer has any registered party members standing for election on the PiS electoral committee lists. While the party's entire parliamentary club sought election on PiS list, four party members were candidates for Piotr Liroy-Marzec's "Effective" political party electoral committee in Constituency № 35 (Olsztyn). The party performed very poorly in elections, worsened by a scandal that the party presented signatures of support from the deceased.

In February 2020, after long-standing legal problems, further exacerbated by the death of the leader in November 2019, a curator was finally appointed and the party was disbanded.

References

External links 
Official website

2015 establishments in Poland
2020 disestablishments in Poland
Anti-communism in Poland
Anti-communist parties
Defunct political parties in Poland
Economic nationalism
Nationalist parties in Poland
Polish nationalism
Polish nationalist parties
Political parties disestablished in 2020
Political parties established in 2015
Right-wing parties in Europe